Bhagamandala is a pilgrimage place in Kodagu district of the Indian state of Karnataka.

Location
Bhagamandala is situated on the river Kaveri in its upstream stretches. At this place, the Kaveri is joined by two tributaries, the Kannike and the mythical Sujyothi river. Bhagamandala is located 133 km south-east of Mangalore.

Pilgrim center – Bhagandeshwara Temple
A temple of Lord Supremo Shiva in the name of Bhagandeshwara embellishes the place. It is the local belief that Kaveri, revered as Dakshina Ganga, comes out of the matted hair locks of Shiva here.
During Tula Sankramana which falls on 17 or 18 October, pilgrims assemble here in large numbers.

Three river meet
This place is also known as Bhagandeshwara Kshetra, from which the name Bhagamandala is derived. The temples in this area are built in Karavali (West Coast) style.

History
During 1785–1790, the area was occupied by Tipu Sultan. The temple was burnt and destroyed. He renamed Bhagamandala to Afzalabad. In 1790 King Dodda Vira Rajendra took Bhagamandala back into an independent Kodagu kingdom.

Bhagamandala is located about 33 km from the district headquarters Madikeri and is connected by paved roads from Madikeri, Virajpet and nearby places in Karnataka and Kerala. Government and private buses are available on all of these routes.

Padi temple
A short distance from Bhagamandala is the temple at Padi, which houses the deity Lord Igguthappa and is one of the most sacred shrines of the Kodava people.

Aiyangeri temple
There is one more temple at Aiyangeri, named "Chinnathappa", which houses the deity Lord Sri Krishna, considered by the people of the village to be the most sacred shrine in their home land.  There is a festival once a year in the month of February or March, where the "Golden Flute" will be brought out from the temple.

Mount Thavoor

Mt. Thavoor is a peak overlooking Bhagamandala and Mt. Koppatti, which may be considered its twin peak is nearby and both these serve as trekking routes for the Shola forest range.

Climate 

Bhagamandala experiences a Tropical monsoon climate under the Köppen climate classification.

See also
 Madikeri
 Sullia
 Mangalore
 Virajpet
 Bhagamandala Nad (Vidhan Sabha constituency)

References

External links
https://web.archive.org/web/20071023221250/http://kodagu.nic.in/tour/bhagamandala.htm

Tourist attractions in Karnataka
Hindu temples in Kodagu district
Hill stations in Karnataka